Hasan Isaev (born November 9, 1952) is a Bulgarian freestyle wrestler of Turkish descent. He became Olympic champion in 1976 in the freestyle light flyweight class.

References

External links
 

1952 births
Living people
Wrestlers at the 1976 Summer Olympics
Bulgarian male sport wrestlers
Olympic gold medalists for Bulgaria
Olympic medalists in wrestling
Medalists at the 1976 Summer Olympics
20th-century Bulgarian people
21st-century Bulgarian people